Possession is the third and final album by the metalcore band, Benea Reach.

Critical reception
Adam Rees of Metal Hammer wrote "However, it’s the centrepiece, Crown, that encompasses everything that makes Possession such a startling achievement, melding heaviness and haunting beauty with deft ease." Andy Synn of No Clean Singing stated "The performances are impeccable, the passion is palpable, and the end result is truly magical. A triumph of creativity over popularity."

Track listing

Personnel
Benea Reach
 Ilkka Viitasalo - Vocals, Backing Vocals
 Marco Storm - Drums, Percussion, Guitar, Keyboards, Programming, Backing Vocals
 Mikael Wildøn - Bass, Guitar, Keyboards, Programming, Backing Vocals
 Martin Silverstein - Guitar
 Thomas Wang - Guitar, Keyboards, Backing Vocals

Additional musicians
 Bruce Fitzhugh - Vocals
 Ingvild Østgård - Vocals, Choir Vocals
 Elisa Herbig - Cello'
 Ombeline Chardes - Violin, Viola
 Maria Solheim - Vocals, Choir Vocals
 Elisabeth C. Berglihn - Choir Vocals

Production
 Tue Madsen - Producer, Mixing, Mastering

References

Benea Reach albums
2013 albums